Peck Yen Wei (born 10 February 1996) is a Malaysian badminton player. She started playing badminton at aged ten in Sekolah Jenis Kebangsaan (C) Jinjang Utara. She made her debut in the international tournament in 2014, and at the same year she selected to join the national team.

Career 
In the junior event, she was the champion at the U-18 2013 Thailand Junior Championship in the girls' doubles event. Peck won her first senior international title at the 2016 Portugal International tournament in the women's doubles event partnered with Goh Yea Ching. Teamed-up with the Olympic silver medalist Chan Peng Soon in the mixed doubles event, they reached the semi-final round at the 2017 Indonesia Open, defeated by the 2016 Rio mixed doubles gold medalist from Indonesia Tontowi Ahmad and Liliyana Natsir in straight games. She won the mixed doubles title at the 2018 Malaysia International Challenge tournament partnered with Chen Tang Jie.

Peck resigned from Badminton Association of Malaysia (BAM) on 1 November 2022 due to the break-up with long-time partner Chen Tang Jie and an untimely ankle injury. She has joined CPS Badminton Academy - which is founded by Chan Peng Soon - in Petaling Jaya as their coach.

Achievements

Southeast Asian Games 
Mixed doubles

BWF World Tour (1 runner-up) 
The BWF World Tour, which was announced on 19 March 2017 and implemented in 2018, is a series of elite badminton tournaments sanctioned by the Badminton World Federation (BWF). The BWF World Tours are divided into levels of World Tour Finals, Super 1000, Super 750, Super 500, Super 300, and the BWF Tour Super 100.

Mixed doubles

BWF International Challenge/Series (2 titles, 4 runners-up) 
Women's doubles

Mixed doubles

  BWF International Challenge tournament
  BWF International Series tournament
  BWF Future Series tournament

References

External links 
 

1996 births
Living people
Sportspeople from Kuala Lumpur
Malaysian female badminton players
Malaysian sportspeople of Chinese descent
Malaysian people of Hokkien descent
Malaysian people of Chinese descent